Abidji (also known as Abiji and Ambidji) is a language of uncertain classification within the Kwa branch of the Niger–Congo family. It is spoken in the Ivory Coast.

It has two dialects: "enyembe" and "ogbru". These dialects' names are used by the members of these Abidji-speaking ethnic groups to refer to themselves. The name Ambidji was given to the language by these groups' neighbors.

Villages
Abidji is spoken in these villages:

Writing System
Abidji is written with a Latin alphabet, using the graphemes of the practical writing for the languages of the Ivory Coast. The letter upsilon ‹ Ʊ, ʊ › is often replaced with the V with hook ‹ Ʋ, ʋ ›.

The nasal vowels are written with ‹ n › (‹ m › before ‹ p › and ‹ b ›) : ‹ an, en, ɛn, in, on, ɔn, un, ʊn ou ʋn, ɩn ›.

Phonology

References

External links
 Abidji basic lexicon at the Global Lexicostatistical Database
 Listen to a sample of Abidji from Global Recordings Network
 World Atlas of Language Structures information on Abidji

Languages of Ivory Coast
Lagoon languages